Discography of a Japanese singer-songwriter Yōsui Inoue

Album discography

Studio albums

Live albums

Charting compilation albums
This is the list of the compilations by Yōsui Inoue that entered on the Oricon Weekly Albums (LP, audio cassette, and CD) Charts. Aside from the following releases, multiple compilation albums has come out to date.

Other albums

Singles

In the history of Japanese Oricon weekly singles chart, Yōsui Inoue has produced 41 charting singles with sales of 4.8 million copies in total. 15 of them has sold more than 100,000 copies; "Yume no Naka e", "Kokoro Moyou", "Yamiyo no Kuni kara", "Yūdachi", "Aozora, Hitorikiri", "Good, Good-Bye", "Jealousy", "Riverside Hotel", "Isso Serenade", "Natsu no Owari no Harmony", "Shounen Jidai", "Make-up Shadow", "Arigatou", "Coffee Rumba", and "Hana no Kubikazari".

References

Discographies of Japanese artists
Folk music discographies